Claudine Schaul was the defending champion, but lost in the first round to Amy Frazier.

Anabel Medina Garrigues won the title, defeating Marta Domachowska in the final 6–4, 6–3.

Seeds

Draw

Finals

Top half

Bottom half

External links
Draws 

2005 Internationaux de Strasbourg Singles
Internationaux de Strasbourg Singles
2005 in French tennis